Georg Heinrich Brandes was a German painter.

Life
Brandes  was born at Bortfeld, near Brunswick, on 23 May 1803, and learned the rudiments of painting under the guidance of F. Barthels at Brunswick. From 1823 to 1825 he attended the Academy of Munich, where he first devoted himself to historic painting under the tuition of Peter von Cornelius, but then turned his attention to landscapes.

On leaving the Academy, he proceeded to the Tyrol. His pictures from the Bavarian mountains won him a reputation by their grandeur of disposition and effective colouring. In
1830-1 he visited Italy, and passed much of the time in Rome. On his return he settled down in Brunswick, and became a teacher of painting and design as well as gallery inspector at the Ducal Museum. In 1845, together with Neumann, he restored the murals  in Brunswick Cathedral. He died at Brunswick on 6  October 1868.

Works
His most important works include:
View near Rome.
Subiaco.
The Inundation.
Landscape in the Harz Mountains during a Thunderstorm.
View near Salzburg (in the New Pinakothek at Munich).

See also
 List of German painters

References

Sources
 

1803 births
1868 deaths
19th-century German painters
19th-century German male artists
German male painters
Academy of Fine Arts, Munich alumni
German landscape painters
People from Peine (district)
Artists from Braunschweig
People from the Duchy of Brunswick